Mehrabad-e Chaft Sar (also Romanized as Mehrābād-e Chaft Sar; also known as Mehrābād) is a village in Larim Rural District, Gil Khuran District, Juybar County, Mazandaran Province, Iran. At the 2006 census, its population was 60, in 20 families.

References 

Populated places in Juybar County